NGC 442 is a spiral galaxy of type S0/a? (edge on) located in the constellation Cetus. Lewis Swift discovered it on October 21, 1886. Dreyer first described it as "very faint, small, round, bright star to southeast." The star is actually located northeast of NGC 442, but, due to the way optical telescopes worked, it was not unusual for some confusion of directions to occur.

References

External links
 

0442
18861021
Cetus (constellation)
Spiral galaxies
004484